Tetraclitidae is a family of sessile barnacles in the order Balanomorpha. There are about 10 genera and more than 50 described species in Tetraclitidae.

Genera
These 10 genera belong to the family Tetraclitidae:
 Astroclita Ren & Liu, 1979
 Epopella Ross, 1970
 Lissaclita Gomez-Daglio & Van Syoc, 2006
 Neonrosella Jones, 2010
 Newmanella Ross, 1969
 Tesseropora Pilsbry, 1916
 Tetraclita Schumacher, 1817
 Tetraclitella Hiro, 1939
 Yamaguchiella Ross & Perreault, 1999
 † Tesseroplax Ross, 1969

References

 
Crustacean families